The Bruce Mine Headframe is the headframe of a former underground mine in Chisholm, Minnesota, United States.  It was built 1925–26 and operated until the mine closed in the early 1940s.  The Bruce Mine Headframe was listed on the National Register of Historic Places in 1978 for its state-level significance in the theme of engineering.  It was nominated for being the last standing example of the headframes that once proliferated on the Mesabi Range.  Most of the other headframes were dismantled as open-pit mining overtook underground mining as the dominant extraction method in the region.

The Bruce Mine Headframe is adjacent to the Mesabi Trail.  After six years of planning and negotiation for access rights, the non-profit Chisholm Beautification Association began developing a park around the headframe in 2018.

See also
 National Register of Historic Places listings in St. Louis County, Minnesota

References

1926 establishments in Minnesota
Buildings and structures completed in 1926
Buildings and structures in St. Louis County, Minnesota
Industrial buildings and structures on the National Register of Historic Places in Minnesota
Iron mining
Mining in Minnesota
National Register of Historic Places in St. Louis County, Minnesota